The Championship, known as the Betfred Championship for sponsorship reasons, is a professional rugby league competition. It is the second-tier competition organised by the Rugby Football League, the governing body for the sport in England, and consists of 14 teams, with promotion to the Super League and relegation to the third-tier competition, League One. The league announced a two-year sponsorship deal with the bookmaking company Betfred ahead of the 2018 season. The current champions are Leigh Centurions, winners of the 2022 season after beating Batley Bulldogs in the Million Pound Game to win promotion to Super League 2023.

From 2003 to 2009, the competition was known as National League One.

History

1902–1973: Establishment and regular competition
Second division rugby league competitions have been played at various times since 1902, and have been in place annually since 1973. When Super League began in 1996, the second division continued to operate a system of promotion and relegation with the new competition. In 1999, the second-tier competition below the Super League was renamed the Northern Ford Premiership (NFP) when Northern Ford Dealers acquired the naming rights.

2002–2008: National Leagues
In 2003, the NFP was re-organised into National Leagues One and Two. Teams that finished in the top ten league positions of the 2002 Northern Ford Premiership joined National League One and the bottom eight joined National League Two. They were joined by London Skolars from the Rugby League Conference, who entered National League Two, and York City Knights, who replaced the defunct York Wasps (who had folded mid-season in 2002) and also joined National League Two in 2003, creating two ten-team leagues which operated a system of promotion and relegation between themselves while also maintaining the promotion and relegation between National League One and Super League.

At the same time, National League Three was created with teams from the Rugby League Conference and from the British Amateur Rugby League Association amateur leagues. It was intended that there would be promotion and relegation between National League Two and National League Three when League Three became more established, however this never eventuated.

2009–2014: Championship
In 2009 Super League was expanded to 14 teams, with two additional teams being promoted from National League One. In turn, two additional teams were promoted from National League Two to National League One at the end of the 2008 season, reducing the number of teams in National League Two to 10. National Leagues One and Two were then rebranded as the Championship and Championship 1 respectively, with the change being implemented in time for the 2009 season. Championship 1 was later rebranded to League 1. During this period, a system of licensing was put in place which meant there was no automatic system of promotion and relegation between the Championship and Super League, although promotion and relegation continued between the Championship and League 1. Widnes Vikings were promoted to Super League from the Championship via the licensing system in 2011.

The record crowd for a club game at this level of competition was set in 2017 at KCOM Craven Park for the opening fixture of the season between Hull Kingston Rovers and Bradford Bulls with Rovers winning 54–24 in front of a crowd of 8,817. The crowd record for regular season attendance was also broken in 2008 with an average of 2,205 spectators at each game.

2015–2018: Super 8s

In 2013, Super League clubs agreed to reduce the number of clubs in the competition to 12 and return to an amended system of promotion and relegation with a 12-club Championship competition. These changes came into effect for the 2015 season.

Under the amended structure, the 12 Super League and 12 Championship clubs play a regular season of 23 rounds, including a Magic Weekend for both divisions. Following the conclusion of their regular league seasons, the 24 clubs then compete in a play-off series where they split into 3 divisions of 8 based upon league position:
The bottom 4 Super League clubs and the top 4 Championship clubs compete in The Qualifiers. They play each other once (either home or away) to determine which four of the clubs will compete in Super League the following year.
The remaining (bottom 8) Championship clubs compete for the Championship Shield and to avoid relegation to League 1. Two clubs will be relegated each year.

2019–onwards: Return of playoffs

On 14 September 2018, an EGM was called to discuss the future of the sport and a change in structure, as the clubs were in favour of scrapping the Super 8s in favour of a more conventional structure. Two proposals were put forward: one by Super League and one by the Championship and League 1;

Super League proposal: The Super League proposed staying with 12 teams who play each other home and away plus Magic Weekend and 6 loop fixtures (29 games). They also proposed a return to a top-5 playoff and the 12th placed team being relegated.

Championship & League 1 proposal: The alternative proposal was that Super League would expand to 14 clubs playing 29 games ending with a top-5 playoff. The team finishing 14th would be relegated and 13th would play 2nd, 3rd and 4th in the Championship in a relegation playoff.

After a vote, the Super League proposal was voted through was implemented for the 2019 season. The Championship clubs then voted for a top 5 playoff being used to decide which team will be promoted to Super League.

Clubs

''Seat capacity for other sports, concerts and events may differ.

Structure

Regular season
The 14 teams compete in the Championship. They play each other once home and away interrupted by the Summer Bash. Two points are awarded for a win and one for a draw. At the end of the season the bottom two teams are relegated and the top 5 take part in the playoffs.

Summer Bash

In 2015 the Championship staged its own Magic Weekend held at Bloomfield Road where all 14 Championship clubs play an extra round usually against a rival.

Play-offs
The current play-off system was previously used between 2003 and 2006 and is used by the Super League.

Results

The champions of the Championship, and the team promoted to the Super League (except during the licensing period), is determined by a playoff series at the end of the regular season. The team at the top of the league table at the end of regular season is awarded the RFL Championship Leaders' Shield. This has been the case for all but the four seasons of the Super 8s era where the league leaders were declared champions and promotion was determined by The Qualifiers.

Winners

Sponsor
The Championship has been sponsored four times since its inception in 2003. Betfred are the current title sponsor.

The title sponsor has been able to determine the league's sponsorship name. There have been seven different title sponsors since the league's formation:

The official rugby ball supplier is Steeden.

Media

TV
Sky Sports and Premier Sports shared the TV rights to the Championship between 2008 and 2012. After Sky only showed the Championship and Championship 1 Grand Finals while games were broadcast on Premier Sports until 2013. There was no TV coverage on the Championship in 2014. In 2015 Sky Sports won the rights to show the Championship including The Summer Bash, Championship Shield and The Qualifiers in a seven-year deal.

A two-year broadcast deal with Premier Sports for 2022 and 2023 was signed at the end of 2021. Premier show a live match every Monday as well as all seven matches from the Summer Bash. The deal also includes the broadcasting rights to play-off matches and the Million Pound Game.

Premier Sports became part of Viaplay late in 2022 and was marketed as Viaplay Sports for the 2023 season.

Radio
Regional radio stations have coverage of the Championship clubs but mostly only cover Super League clubs in the same area and give updates of Championship scores and results.

Academies

Reserve League

In 2014 and 2015 Super League clubs were unhappy with the Dual registration system and wanted to form an Under 23 reserve leagues between the Under 19s and 1st team. Wigan, Warrington and St Helens were the first teams to propose the return of the reserve league where players could move from the under 19s and play with professional players before playing in the 1st team. A reserve league was set up in 2016 with a mixture of Super League, Championship and League 1 teams.

Dual registration
Clubs in both the Super League and the Championships benefit from the new dual registration system which was introduced for the 2013 season. The new system is intended to complement the existing player loan system.

Dual registration refers to an arrangement between clubs whereby a player continues to be registered to his current Super League club and is also registered to play for a club in the Championship. The system is aimed at young Super League players who are thought to be not quite ready to make the step up to ‘week in, week out’ Super League first team duties but for whom first team match experience is likely to be beneficial for their development.

Only Super League players can be dual registered and the receiving club must be a club in the Championships, meaning that Super League to Super League club dual registrations are not available.
A dual registered player will be eligible to play and train with both clubs in a format agreed between the clubs, subject to registration, salary cap and competition eligibility rules.
The player is restricted to playing in one fixture per scheduled round of fixtures in any given week and would not be eligible to play for his Super League club on a Thursday and in a Championship fixture at the weekend, for example.
A receiving club will be limited to a total of five dual registered players per matchday squad.

Match officials

All rugby league matches are governed by the laws set out by the RFL; these laws are enforced by match officials. Former Super League and International Referee  Steve Ganson is the current  Head of the Match Officials Department and Technical Director.

See also

 British rugby league system
 Super League
 Rugby League Conference
 Northern Ford Premiership
 Championship Cup
 Rugby League Reserve Team Championship
 List of professional sports teams in the United Kingdom

Notes

References

External links

Official Championship website 
RFL Championship coverage
Scores from Sky Sports
RugbyLeague.org Championship Fans Forums

 
1996 establishments in Europe
Sports leagues established in 1996
European rugby league competitions
Rugby league competitions in the United Kingdom
Rugby Football League Championship
Professional sports leagues in the United Kingdom
Professional sports leagues in France
Professional sports leagues in Canada
Multi-national professional sports leagues